Volkertshausen is a town in the district of Konstanz in Baden-Württemberg, Germany.

Twin towns
Volkertshausen is twinned with:

  Bolsena, Italy
  Schönau-Berzdorf, Germany

References

Konstanz (district)